The Norian is a division of the Triassic Period. It has the rank of an age (geochronology) or stage (chronostratigraphy). It lasted from ~227 to  million years ago. It was preceded by the Carnian and succeeded by the Rhaetian.

Stratigraphic definitions

The Norian was named after the Noric Alps in Austria. The stage was introduced into scientific literature by Austrian geologist Edmund Mojsisovics von Mojsvar in 1869.

The Norian Stage begins at the base of the ammonite biozones of Klamathites macrolobatus and Stikinoceras kerri, and at the base of the conodont biozones of Metapolygnathus communisti and Metapolygnathus primitius. A global reference profile for the base (a GSSP) had in 2009 not yet been appointed.

The top of the Norian (the base of the Rhaetian) is at the first appearance of ammonite species Cochloceras amoenum. The base of the Rheatian is also close to the first appearance of conodont species Misikella spp. and Epigondolella mosheri and the radiolarid species Proparvicingula moniliformis.

In the Tethys domain, the Norian Stage contains six ammonite biozones:
zone of Halorites macer
zone of Himavatites hogarti
zone of Cyrtopleurites bicrenatus
zone of Juvavites magnus
zone of Malayites paulckei
zone of Guembelites jandianus

Subages 
The Norian is divided into three global subages or substages:

 Lacian (lower Norian)
 Alaunian (middle Norian)
 Sevatian (upper Norian)

Many older studies considered the Rhaetian to be the uppermost substage of the Norian, though it has subsequently been raised to its own stage. 

The Revueltian land-vertebrate faunachron corresponds to part of the Norian.

Notable formations 

 Calcare di Zorzino (Italy)
 Caturrita Formation (Rio Grande do Sul, Brazil)
 Chinle Formation (SW USA)
 Cow Branch Formation (North Carolina and Virginia, USA)
 Dockum Group (Carnian – Norian)* (SW USA)
 Dolomia di Forni (Italy)
 Fleming Fjord Formation* (Greenland)
 Lisowice* (Poland)
 Los Colorados Formation (Argentina)
 Upper Maleri Formation* (India)
 Stubensandstein (Germany)
 Trossingen Formation (Norian – Rhaetian) (Switzerland and Germany)

* Tentatively assigned to the Norian; age estimated primarily via terrestrial tetrapod biostratigraphy (see Triassic land vertebrate faunachrons)

References

Notes

Literature
; 2005: The Global boundary Stratotype Section and Point (GSSP) of the Ladinian Stage (Middle Triassic) at Bagolino (Southern Alps, Northern Italy) and its implications for the Triassic time scale, Episodes 28(4), pp. 233–244.
; 2004: A Geologic Time Scale 2004, Cambridge University Press.
; 2004: Mammals from the Age of Dinosaurs, Columbia University Press.
; 2008: Lithostratigraphy, chemostratigraphy, and vertebrate biostratigraphy of the Dockum Group (Upper Triassic), of southern Garza County, West Texas, Doctoral Dissertation, Texas Tech.

External links
GeoWhen Database - Norian
Upper Triassic timescale, at the website of the subcommission for stratigraphic information of the ICS
Norges Network of offshore records of geology and stratigraphy: Stratigraphic charts for the Triassic,  and 

 
02
Geological ages
Triassic geochronology